Stephen of Aumale (–1127) was Count of Aumale from before 1089 to 1127, and Lord of Holderness.

Life
He was son of Odo, Count of Champagne, and Adelaide of Normandy, countess of Aumale, sister of William the Conqueror. Stephen succeeded his mother as Count before 1089.

In the conspiracy of 1095 against William Rufus, the object of the rebels was to place Stephen on the English throne. Stephen was the first cousin of brothers William Rufus, King of England and Robert Curthose, Duke of Normandy. The leaders were Robert de Mowbray and Guillaume III of Eu, Count of Eu. Stephen was apparently not put on trial himself as he may have been out of the king's reach in Normandy.  Stephen's father Odo of Champagne lost his English lands for his complicity.  

In 1096 Stephen joined the First Crusade as part of the army of Robert Curthose, Duke of Normandy. Following the death of King William Rufus, in 1102 Stephen was given back his father's confiscated lands and became lord of Holderness, Yorkshire, England. He sided with Henry I in 1104 against Robert II Curthose but in 1118, when William Clito rebelled against Henry I of England, Stephen supported him, with Baldwin VII of Flanders. He finally submitted to Henry I in 1119.

Family 
He married Hawise, daughter of Ralph de Mortimer, Lord of Wigmore and Seigneur de St. Victor-en-Caux, and Mélisende. Their children were :

 Guillaume le Gros ( – 1179), Count of Aumale; married Cecily of Skipton, daughter of William fitz Duncan.
 Étienne le Gros (Stephen), (born ) mentioned 1150; married the daughter of Roger Mortimer
 Enguerrand or Ingelran de Aumale, mentioned 1150
 Agnès ( – after 1170), married William de Roumare († 1151), son of William de Roumare, Earl of Lincoln. As his widow she secondly married Adam I de Brus, Lord of Skelton.

Notes

References

1070s births
1127 deaths
11th-century French people
12th-century French people
Counts of Aumale
Year of birth uncertain
Christians of the First Crusade
House of Blois
William II of England